Acumen (formerly known as Acumen Fund, legally Acumen Fund, Inc.) is a nonprofit impact investment fund focused on investing in social enterprises that serve low-income individuals in the United States. Acumen was founded in April 2001 by Jacqueline Novogratz. It aims to demonstrate that small amounts of philanthropic capital, combined with business acumen, can result in thriving enterprises that serve vast numbers of the poor. Over the years, Acumen has invested $115 million in 113 companies and has had a successful track record in sourcing and executing investment opportunities in the clean energy, health care and agriculture sectors.

History

Acumen was founded in 2001 by Jacqueline Novogratz, with help of seed capital from the Rockefeller Foundation, Cisco Systems Foundations and three individual philanthropists. Acumen uses a business mechanism to fight poverty, investing in for-profit businesses that treat the poor as customers.

Investment model
Acumen's model is to invest as equity or debt in social enterprises, both for-profit or nonprofit organizations, that are serving people living below, at or slightly above the poverty line. Key to their model is patient capital, allowing an extended timeline for a return (7–12 years). They are looking for a 1X return across their portfolio of investments and they re-invest their gains. In choosing these organizations, Acumen tends to focus on companies working in off-grid, renewable energy and agriculture.

Investments

WaterHealth International:

In 2004, Acumen invested in WaterHealth International, a for-profit organization that supplies clean water to the poor population in rural India, Ghana and the Philippines. Acumen partners with the International Finance Corporation of the World Bank and Dow Chemical Venture Fund to supply, people in rural areas of third world countries, clean supply of water alongside earning a substantial gross margin that keeps these hybrid enterprises thriving.

PEG Africa:
In 2017, Acumen invested in PEG Africa, the leading pay-as-you-go solar home system distribution company in West Africa. PEG Africa launched in Ghana in 2015, and today serves customers across Ghana, Côte d'Ivoire and Senegal, bringing affordable solar products to those who do not have access to the electrical grid.

Social Return on Investment

When investing in businesses, Acumen measures success in the number of lives reached in bottom of the pyramid markets. For them, success is correlated with the social change that occurs in people's lives. For example, when looking to invest in a company that makes and distributes anti-malarial bed nets, Acumen uses numbers to measure the social impact of this company. This means that greater number of anti-malarial bed nets manufactured and distributed, the more impact the company made. If a company builds toilets and shower facilities in urban slums and business districts, the success of this investment is measured by the number of times the toilet and shower facilities are used.

Acumen measures the immediate output and considers it when looking for businesses to invest in, but doesn't focus on whether these social changes are contributing to decrease in malaria or improvement in health and environment. Its former CEO, Brian Trelstad argues that the latter approach is complicated, expensive and impractical for emerging companies. Instead, Acumen measures between output and impact, i.e. distribution of bed nets to reduction of malaria.

Grants

Bill and Melinda Gates Foundation:

 In November 2015, the Bill and Melinda Gates Foundation granted over $2 million to Acumen to invest in Ethiopia's poultry market as a means to improve the lives of smallholder farmers.
 In November 2008, the foundation granted $2.6 million to Acumen to develop and produce a system to provide safe water to the world's poorest people by applying a human-centered approach to innovation and design.
 In November 2008, the foundation granted $6.7 million to Acumen to support its mission of providing agriculture inputs to smallholder farmers to better the lives of poor farmer families
 In January 2006, the foundation granted $4.2 million to Acumen to support its mission of providing safe water and sanitation services on a fee for service basis.

Cisco, Sapling Foundation

 In 2005, Cisco Systems and Sapling Foundation matched donations up to a total of $1 million during the Clinton Global Initiative Inaugural meeting. It was used to deliver clean water, health and housing through investment in innovative, social entrepreneurs.

Partnerships

The Clinton Foundation:

In 2015, Acumen, Unilever and the Clinton Guistra Enterprise Partnership, part of the Clinton Foundation, launched an initiative called the Enhanced Livelihood Investment Initiative to improve the lives of farmers and their communities in Africa, South Asia, Latin America and the Caribbean. The initiative involves a 3-year, $10 Million commitment to improve the economic lives of farmers by creating and improving privately held companies which links the farmers to Unilever's global supply chain and distribution network. This increases the social and economic impact of these businesses alongside sustaining them.

The challenges in this initiative involve difficulty in accessing and adopting beneficial agricultural innovations as well as the company's challenge in providing it and still remaining profitable. This partnership helps in overcoming these challenges by developing repeatable models to scale the adoption of agricultural innovations.

Additional partners include Alnylam Pharmaceuticals, AlphaSights, American Express, Autodesk Foundation, Bain & Company, Bank of America, Barclays, Ernst & Young, IKEA Foundation, Mitsubishi Group, Safaricom, SAP, Signify, Target Foundation and UBS Optimus Foundation.

Other projects

LifeSpring Hospitals:

LifeSpring hospitals is a joint venture of Acumen and Hindustan Latex Limited to provide women with a cheaper and accessible way of childbirth. It started in 2005 when Anant Kumar, CEO of HLL (now known as HLL Lifecare) travelled to hospitals to talk to women about family planning practices and contraceptive use. Kumar found out that most women were unsatisfied with the level of care at public hospitals, some were so frustrated that they would take out loans to finance visits to private facilities. Kumar took the idea of opening a high-quality maternal care institution to low-income families in the sprawling Hyderabad urban slums. The concept involved provision of high quality pre- and post-natal health care services priced at 50–70% the price of private clinics. The concept was welcomed among the poor population and it was expanded to nine hospitals in low-income areas by 2009. Its narrow specialization in maternal health care has been instrumental in lowering costs and increasing productivity in its locations. By limiting capital expenditures such as renting hospital buildings on multi year leases, outsourcing pharmacy and laboratory services and reducing the amount of machinery to only those necessary in performing a safe normal delivery, LifeSpring hospitals has brought the cost down to make it accessible to the poor population.

Through its process-driven model, LifeSpring has filled a void in the Indian healthcare landscape. Its developmental goals are to reduce maternal and child mortality while achieving financial sustainability. It ensures that more babies are born with qualified physicians rather than at home in high-risk situations. Additional income generated apart from deliveries is attributed to family planning services, consultation fees and rent from outsourced laboratory and pharmacy.

Raising money for expansion

In December 2013, LifeSpring Hospitals decided to raise $3.2 million to fund its expansion plan and to set up another maternity home.

References

External links
Acumen website
 Investing in the World's Poor Stanford Graduate School of Business, May 2007
 Developing Entrepreneurship among the World's Poorest The McKinsey Quarterly, March 2009
 The Patient Capitalist The Economist, May 21, 2009

Development charities based in the United States
Funding bodies
International charities
Charities based in New York (state)
Organizations established in 2001